Duncan de Moor (born 11 April 1994), known professionally as Duncan Laurence, is a Dutch singer and songwriter. He represented the Netherlands in the Eurovision Song Contest 2019 with his song "Arcade" and went on to win the competition, giving the Netherlands its first Eurovision win since 1975. "Arcade" became one of the most successful Eurovision Song Contest winning entries on streaming platforms and international charts in recent history. Prior to Eurovision, Laurence was a semi-finalist in the fifth season of The Voice of Holland.

Career

Early life and career

Born in Spijkenisse, Laurence grew up in Hellevoetsluis. He began writing his own songs as a teenager, as an escape from being bullied. He started his musical career at the Rock Academy in Tilburg, playing in a number of school bands, including his own, The Slick and Suited. Formed in 2013, the band went on to perform at Eurosonic Noorderslag. In February 2020, he revealed that he had oxygen deprivation at birth, and thus has had a motor disorder affect his right hand.

2014–2018: The Voice of Holland and independent work
Laurence participated in the fifth season of The Voice of Holland, choosing Ilse DeLange as his coach. He advanced to the semi-finals before being eliminated. In March 2016, he left The Slick. Laurence graduated from the Rock Academy in 2017. He, with Jihad Rahmouni, wrote the music to K-pop duo TVXQ's song "Closer" for their 2018 album New Chapter #1: The Chance of Love.

2019–2021: Eurovision Song Contest, Worlds on Fire and Small Town Boy

In January 2019, Laurence was internally selected to represent the Netherlands in the Eurovision Song Contest 2019, held in Tel Aviv, Israel. He was nominated by DeLange, with whom he remained in contact after The Voice. His song, "Arcade", was released in March 2019. Arriving as the main favourite to win, Laurence eventually went on to win the contest, having received a total of 498 points. He is the fifth Dutch entrant to win the competition, and the first since Teach-In won the Eurovision Song Contest 1975 with the song "Ding-a-dong". As a result of the following year's contest being cancelled due to the COVID-19 pandemic, Laurence is the longest reigning Eurovision winner, having held the title for two consecutive years.

After his Eurovision victory, Laurence embarked on a concert tour across the Netherlands and Europe. On 10 June 2019, he performed at the 50th anniversary of Pinkpop Festival in Landgraaf, the first Dutch Eurovision winner to perform at the event. He replaced the Swedish duo First Aid Kit who dropped out due to health reasons. On 23 October 2019, Laurence released his second single, "Love Don't Hate It". It was also announced that he signed a recording contract with Capitol Records. In 2020, the artists' entrance at Rotterdam Ahoy was re-named "Door Duncan" in his honour. On 13 May 2020, Laurence released his first extended play (EP), Worlds on Fire, which included the singles "Arcade", "Love Don't Hate It", and "Someone Else", along with two new tracks. His first studio album, Small Town Boy, followed on 13 November 2020. It was certified platinum in the Netherlands three days after its release. The album's release was preceded by "Feel Something", a collaboration with fellow Dutch DJ Armin van Buuren.

In the second half of 2020, "Arcade" went viral on video sharing service TikTok, resulting in the song's new chart success and rise in streams on various platforms. In January 2021, "Arcade" became the most-streamed Eurovision song on Spotify, surpassing a record previously held by Eurovision 2019 runner-up Mahmood and his entry "Soldi". On 12 February 2021, "Arcade" reached the UK Singles Chart's top 40, and two weeks later it peaked at number 29. In March, Laurence made his US television debut performing "Arcade" on Today, and later also performed the song's duet version alongside Fletcher on The Ellen DeGeneres Show. Following these promotional appearances, the song broke into the US Billboard Hot 100 chart, becoming the first Eurovision song in 25 years and the first Eurovision winning song in 45 years to do so; it eventually peaked at number 30.

At the Eurovision Song Contest 2021 held in Rotterdam, Laurence opened the first semi-final with "Feel Something". In the same event, he was awarded a Global Platinum record for one billion streams of "Arcade". However, he later tested positive for COVID-19, which prevented him from performing live in the grand final. Pre-recorded footage of his performance, consisting of "Arcade" and a new single from Small Town Boy's deluxe edition, "Stars", was broadcast instead during the final.

2021–present: Upcoming second studio album 

On 11 June 2021, the soundtrack album for the second season of the Hulu series Love, Victor was released. Among the artists featured on the soundtrack was Laurence with "Heaven Is a Hand to Hold", which he co-wrote with Leland, Jordan Garfield and Peter Thomas. Laurence also features on American singer Wrabel's single "Back to Back", which was released on 30 July off of the latter's debut album These Words Are All for You. "Wishes Come True", a standalone Christmas single, followed on 26 November. In 2022, Laurence served as a coach on the sixth season of The Voice Kids Belgium, where a member of his team, Karista, won.

On 3 August 2022, Laurence released "Electric Life", which serves as the lead single of his forthcoming second studio album. A collaborative single with Rosa Linn, "WDIA (Would Do It Again)", followed on 21 October.

Musical influences 
In a brief interview, Laurence cited Coldplay, Snow Patrol, Ryan Tedder, Sia, Sam Smith and Adele as influences.

Personal life
Laurence came out as bisexual in 2016, which he addressed publicly in an Instagram post in October 2018. During a press conference shortly before the Eurovision final, he affirmed his sexuality: "I am more than just an artist, I am a person, I am a living being, I'm bisexual, I'm a musician, I stand for things. And I'm proud that I get the chance to show what I am, who I am." On 5 October 2020, he announced his engagement to American songwriter Jordan Garfield. The two are set to marry in mid-2023.

Discography

Studio albums

Extended plays

Singles

As lead artist

As featured artist

Non-single album appearances

Soundtrack appearances

Songwriting discography

Awards and nominations

Notes

References

External links

Duncan Laurence at Eurovision

1994 births
Living people
People from Spijkenisse
Dutch male singer-songwriters
Eurovision Song Contest entrants for the Netherlands
Eurovision Song Contest entrants of 2019
Eurovision Song Contest winners
21st-century Dutch singers
The Voice (franchise) contestants
Dutch LGBT singers
Dutch LGBT songwriters
Musicians from South Holland
Bisexual singers
Bisexual songwriters
20th-century LGBT people
21st-century LGBT people